Norair Aslanyan (né Norair Mamedov; born 25 March 1991) is an Armenian footballer who plays as a winger for OFC Oostzaan in the Dutch Derde Divisie.

Early life
Aslanyan was born on 25 March 1991 in the village of Karahunj in the Armenian SSR, to Armenian parents. Prior to his birth, the family had adopted the Azerbaijani surname of "Mamedov" in order to move to Europe easily and get the status of Azeri refugees during the First Nagorno-Karabakh War. The family later moved to the Netherlands. Aslanyan grew up speaking both Dutch and Armenian.

Club career
Aslanyan started playing football in the Netherlands at the age of 13 with the youth team of FC Groningen. At 17, Aslanyan was part of the FC Groningen team that became the junior champions of the Netherlands; he also participated in a youth tournament held in the United States, where the team took 2nd place.

While playing with the youth team, he was noticed by coaches from the first team. In 2009, he was loaned to SC Veendam, scoring two goals in his debut game for their youth team. In October 2010, Aslanyan was loaned to SC Cambuur. He played for the club's senior team in the Eerste Divisie, while also training with FC Groningen. As part of Cambuur, he made his senior, professional debut on 15 October 2010 in a match against RKC Waalwijk; the match ended in a 1–1 draw. Aslanyan made a total of 7 league appearances during his loan spell, as well as one appearance in the KNVB Cup.

Following the end of his loan, Aslanyan made his senior debut for Groningen on 3 March 2011 in the Eredivisie league, losing 1–4 at home to Heracles Almelo. He made four further league appearances for the club. Aslanyan was loaned to FC Zwolle later in the season. At the end of the season, he moved to FC Emmen on a free transfer.

He signed for Willem II in July 2013. After one season, he was sent on loan to Almere City.

After a spell in Armenia with Alashkert, he returned to Dutch club FC Emmen in January 2018.

On 27 May 2019 it was confirmed, that Aslanyan had joined OFC Oostzaan.

International career
On 20 February 2012, Armenian national manager Vardan Minasyan called Aslanyan up to the senior national team squad for forthcoming friendly matches against Serbia and Canada. However, he was forced to withdraw from the squad due to an injury he had picked up playing club football. Aslanyan received a further call-up in May 2012.

In January 2013, he received yet another call-up for the Armenian national team. He made his national team debut against Luxembourg national team on 5 February 2013.

Style of play
Aslanyan plays as an attacker, and is known for his speed and acceleration.

Personal life
Norair is married to Anna Aslanyan. They both met at an Armenian party in the Netherlands and began dating afterwards. He changed his surname to hers before he joined the Armenian national squad. After changing his name to Norair Aslanyan, he briefly played under the name "Aslanyan-Mamedov" before a final decision on his documents was made.

Aslanyan has a number of tattoos – a drawing of some roses are depicted, and the first letters are the names of his family, written in the Armenian language, on his hands.

References

External links
 
 

1991 births
Living people
People from Syunik Province
Association football wingers
Dutch footballers
Armenian footballers
Armenian expatriate footballers
Armenia international footballers
FC Groningen players
SC Veendam players
SC Cambuur players
PEC Zwolle players
FC Emmen players
Willem II (football club) players
Almere City FC players
SC Telstar players
FC Alashkert players
VV Katwijk players
Eredivisie players
Eerste Divisie players
Tweede Divisie players
Armenian Premier League players
Expatriate footballers in the Netherlands
Armenian expatriate sportspeople in the Netherlands
OFC Oostzaan players